Predrag Bubalo (born 14 October 1954) is a Serbian politician who held various ministerial positions in the Government of Serbia. He served as the Minister of Foreign Economic Relations in 2004, as the Minister of Economy from 2004 to 2007 and as the Minister of Trade from 2007 to 2008.

Early years and education
He was born on 14 October 1954 in Vladičin Han, SR Serbia, SFR Yugoslavia. He graduated from the University of Novi Sad Faculty of Law and later earned a PhD at the same institution.

From 2002 to 2004, Bubalo had been the general manager of Kikinda-based foundry Kikinda.

Corruption trial
On 3 September 2010, The Anti-Corruption Council of Serbia publicized a list of persons facing criminal charges related to the privatization of the Port of Belgrade company. The criminal complaint was filed three months earlier against 17 persons for abusing their official position during the 2005 privatization. Among them are Bubalo, officials of the Privatization Agency of Serbia, and businessman Milan Beko.

The trial started in July 2014. He pleaded not guilty to all charges, denying allegations of power abuse. On 26 December 2017, Bubalo and other prosecuted officials were acquitted of all charges.

References

External links
 Official profile at the Government of Serbia
 Beko i Bubalo medju optuzenima za korupciju u slucaju Luka Beograd at blic.rs
 Court freezes Port of Belgrade assets at b92.net

1954 births
Living people
People from Vladičin Han
University of Novi Sad alumni
Government ministers of Serbia